Custom Robo Arena, known in Japan as , is a science fiction action role playing game for the Nintendo DS. It is the fifth title in the Custom Robo series. The name was announced during the E3 2006 convention. The game was released later that year on October 19 in Japan. 

This is the only game in the series that received a global release, launching in North America, Europe, and Australia in 2007, and the only game to feature a two-player mode with the Nintendo Wi-Fi Connection including voice chat, Multi-Card play, and DS Download Play. Custom Robo Arena also uses a "Rivals" list.

Plot
The game starts with a player-named male character whose father has just moved into the town of Midheart to work at NeoBrain, a robo research company. Upon arrival, the player met with Liv and Dennis of Team Numero Uno, a robo-battling club. After class on the first day, Team Numero Uno is forced to battle the Grapple Gang, led by Bull, the first major enemy. A teammate from Team Numero Uno switches to Bull's team because they are undefeated in the school. The player decides to join the Numero Uno team. Later, the player fights Bull and the player's team may win or lose.

The player spends the next few days preparing for the Forester prep tournament. Their champion is Serene, who has the power-enhancing Soulboost. Liv's interest in the Soulboost will take the player's team to Mt. Zephyr, where Stark will turn the player away at the top.

Then, the player goes on police duty with police cadet Duncan. After an ambush with a rogue commander and a criminal, the latter of whom the player will illegally fight outside of a Arena, Dennis and Duncan become too weak to fight, and the player is their last hope. Later, after the player has defeated the criminal, the player's team will return to Mt. Zephyr, having been given a note from Kris. Because of this, Stark will teach the player the Soulboost.

Kris will also give the player a special license. Later, a tournament at the robocenter will allow the player to compete in a tournament (the Robo Cup) shortly after. The player's team boards a ship headed for Encephalon Isle, where the Robo Cup is to take place. The President of NeoBrain makes a statement, that the preliminaries will take place on the way. This raises questions by various contestants about what happens to the losers.

Soon, the player arrives at Encephalon Isle. The night before the tournament, however, Liv exhibits strange behavior, walking to the nearby laboratory by herself. She quickly snaps out of it, but she is entirely confused as to how she got out there on her own. The player takes her back to the hotel, and the next day starts after sleeping.

The tournament starts well, various battles taking place according to the plan. The security Robos placed around the forest start to go haywire. Liv and Mr. Geary (the player's father) go missing half-way in as the security Robos go haywire and take out commanders in the tournament. There is only one possible perpetrator to this twisted turn of events: NeoBrain itself. An employee at NeoBrain, Dr. Mars, reveals himself as Scythe, leader of the Greybaum Syndicate, an international terrorist organization that intend to use Robo technology to control the world.

Upon infiltrating the nearby Research Facility, it is learned that the President ultimately regrets his decision, and he helps the player. The player's father is also recovered. With Dennis, the two attempt to find Liv in the underground fortress. The protagonist must defeat four 'Gatekeepers' and two identical illegal robos, 'Jameson'. The Jameson robo is incredibly strong and huge yet the slowest robo in the game.

The character defeats Kindjal, who has masqueraded as a professor at NeoBrain and a teacher at Midheart High. The player then reunites with Liv's brother Eddy, though Eddy is soon injured by Scythe's Katana after gloating over his victory with an autonomous decoy.

They find Liv, but apparently too late, as she is already 'diving' into Hadron, the most powerful Illegal Robo ever created. The player attacks Hadron, taking it down once. Hadron revitalizes itself with Scythe's energy, gaining his personality and dreams, then takes on the player again. This battle is impossible to win, as shots fired by the player do not deal damage but losing this battle does not result in a Game Over.

Dennis and Mr. Geary manage to free Liv, although Hadron still functions. Every character on the player's team is too weak to fight Hadron, and all seems hopeless. Then, all of the competitors in the Robo Cup that survived the security Robos walk in from behind, wanting to help. Liv, being drained of mental energy, cannot help. So instead, all of the competitors lend their mental energy to Liv, who then transfers it to the player's character.

The final battle takes place with both Robos locked in a permanent Soulboost the entire match. Upon defeat, Hadron explodes. The haywire security Robos disengage, and the organization behind the entire mess is shut down, but NeoBrain is left in pieces due to this event.

After the game is beaten, the player learns that Lambda Inc., teaming up with NeoBrain, has offered to host the Robo Cup again, but this time with "no strings attached". The player becomes the next Robo Cup champion, and then set his sights on joining the Police Force, and beating the Great Robo Cup, the player's character never actually enters the International Police Corps in the game, but it is assumed that he does once he has cleared all Grudge and Underground battles.

Gameplay

Battles begin with the opponent's robo customization being shown. Player then may make adjustments to their robo, such as changing parts, polishing, and altering the diorama. This can also be done outside of a battle, in the portable garage.

Battles begin with the player's custom robo cube being launched out of a Robocannon (controlled with the D-pad). There are six sides of the cube on which the robo can land.

The objective of the battle is to reduce the opponent's energy points from 1000 to 0 by using the player's guns, bombs, pods, and dash attacks. There are two third-person views in battle and five different control schemes.

If the player repeatedly loses the same battle, the game offers the option of a health handicap, which goes up to 75%. Each victory increases the player's Soulboost meter and when it is full, Soulboost can be used. Soulboost makes the robo stronger and tougher for about 21 seconds, afterward making the robo weaker for a short time.

Reception

The game received "average" reviews according to video game review aggregator Metacritic. In Japan, Famitsu gave it a score of three eights and one seven, for a total of 31 out of 40.

Other appearances in media
Ray Mk III appeared as an Assist Trophy in the Wii video game Super Smash Bros. Brawl. He also appears as a Trophy and a Sticker in the same game. Ray Mk III also appears as a Spirit and a Mii Fighter Costume in Super Smash Bros. Ultimate.

References

External links

Official Website (English) (Japanese)
Nintendo Online Magazine (N.O.M.) webpage
QJ Release info
Magic-Box confirmation
Custom Robo Arena at N-Sider

Role-playing video games
Action role-playing video games
Multiplayer online games
Nintendo DS games
Nintendo DS-only games
Nintendo Wi-Fi Connection games
Noise (company) games
2006 video games
Custom Robo
Video games developed in Japan
Video games scored by Takayuki Nakamura
Video games produced by Kensuke Tanabe
Multiplayer and single-player video games